The Mississagi River is a river in Algoma and Sudbury Districts, Ontario, Canada, that originates in Sudbury District and flows  to Lake Huron at Blind River, Algoma District.

Etymology
The river's name comes from the Ojibwe misi-zaagi, "river with a wide mouth".

Course

The river then continues south and crosses back into Algoma District, where it remains for the rest of its journey to Lake Huron, and enters the large "L"-shaped Bark Lake. The Mississagi River then flows into Aubrey Lake, partially formed by the Aubrey Falls Generating Station (hydro) and dam, and where the Wenebegon Rivers joins. Not all the water is funnelled into the station, however; some continues to form the Aubrey Falls.

The river turns south and the right tributary Aubinadong River enters, followed by two left tributaries, the Sharpsand River and the Rapid River in quick succession, and further on, another left tributary, Snowshoe Creek from Wakomata Lake.  Then it reaches Tunnel Lake, formed by the George W Rayner Generating Station and Wells Generating Station and associated dams. The river then heads southeast where the left tributary Little White River enters, and continues to Red Rock Lake, created by the Red Rock Falls Generating Station and dam, over the Shino Rapids, takes in the right tributary Bolton River, then reaches the North Channel on Lake Huron.

The river's delta is a "bird's foot" delta, a type not commonly found on the Great Lakes.  The Mississippi River in Louisiana has a bird's foot delta.

Communities along the Mississagi River in upstream order:
Mississauga First Nation
Blind River
Iron Bridge
Wharncliffe, Ontario

History

The Ojibwa people used the river to travel between the forests of the interior and Lake Huron. In 1799, the North West Company built a fur trading post at the mouth of the river. This post was closed in 1900. During the second half of the 19th century, the river was used to transport logs to sawmills at Blind River.

Economy
Ontario Hydro constructed dams and four hydroelectric generating stations on the Mississagi River, Rayner G.S., Wells G.S., Red Rock Falls G.S., and Aubrey Falls G.S. between 1950 and 1970, which today are operated by Brookfield Asset Management. Historically, mining and forestry played a large role, but today tourism is the primary activity along the river.

Highway 129 follows the river from Wharncliffe until the river turns east at Aubrey Falls.

Ecology
The lower river is an important spawning ground for lake sturgeon.

Aubrey Falls Provincial Park is on the river at Aubrey Falls.  Mississagi River Provincial Park encompasses the upper reaches of the river including Mississagi Lake.  Mississagi Provincial Park is on the Boland River, a tributary of the Little White River.  Mississagi Delta Provincial Nature Reserve Park encompasses the river's delta mouth. The Voyageur Hiking Trail follows the lower portion of the river near Iron Bridge.

Tributaries
Abinette River (right)
Cypress River (right)
Wenebegon River (right)
Aubinadong River (right)
Sharpsand River (left)
Rapid River (left)
Grindstone Creek (left)
Little White River (left)
Bolton River (right)

See also
List of rivers of Ontario

References

Rivers of Algoma District
Rivers of Sudbury District
Hudson's Bay Company trading posts
Tributaries of Lake Huron